The 2022–23 Miami Hurricanes men's basketball team represents the University of Miami during the 2022–23 NCAA Division I men's basketball season. Led by twelfth-year head coach Jim Larrañaga, they play their home games at the Watsco Center on the university's campus in Coral Gables, Florida as members of the Atlantic Coast Conference (ACC).

Previous season
The Hurricanes finished the 2021–22 season 26–11, 14–6 in ACC play to finish in fourth place. In the ACC Tournament they defeated Boston College in the quarterfinals before losing to eventual runners-up Duke in the semifinals. They received an at-large bid to the NCAA Tournament where they defeated USC, Auburn and Iowa State to advance to the first Elite Eight in school history where they eventually lost to the eventual national champion, Kansas.

Offseason

Departures

Incoming transfers

2022 recruiting class

Roster

Schedule and results
Source:

|-
!colspan=12 style=| Exhibition

|-
!colspan=12 style=| Regular season

|-
!colspan=12 style=| ACC tournament

|-
!colspan=12 style=| NCAA Tournament

Rankings

*AP does not release post-NCAA Tournament rankings

References

Miami Hurricanes men's basketball seasons
Miami
Miami Hurricanes men's basketball team
Miami Hurricanes men's basketball team
Miami